People's Radio Hong Kong (Chinese:香港人民廣播電台) or its abbreviation PRHK.org (Chinese:人民台)is a defunct online radio station in Hong Kong. The initial objectives include:

 the formation of a local community radio station,
 not accepting donations
 participation in political groups independently operated by volunteers,
 accept public donations as the main source of funding.

Radio Hong Kong People's First, referred to as "people's first", created mainly to comment on current affairs and public issues, and the main program include the "Long Menzhen Storm" and "ShiuShiu Podcast"（風蕭蕭）.

The second station is referred to as "People's second", mainly to discuss a small minority issues and the users produced programs, the current broadcast programs include "international free exercise", "Hong Kong people philosophy stresses", "Hong Kong way out" and " My Network Places " and so on.

In Hong Kong, People's Radio is aired the first Tuesday night with the Neighborhood and Workers Service Center online radio network; Friday will be two sets of programs broadcast .

See also
Media of Hong Kong

References 
Hong Kong Police Raid Independent Radio.  2006-08-30 17:03. Describes the legal problems of an over-the-air independent radio station, and places the operations of People's Radio Hong Kong in context.
Translation:
Pinyin translated with CozyChinese.COM

Internet radio stations
Internet in Hong Kong
Defunct mass media in Hong Kong